The  were mythological female characters associated with youth and springtime in early Slavic mythology.

Vesna may also refer to:

Vesna (given name), Slavic female name
Vesna (surname)
Vesna (film), 1953 Slovene romantic comedy 
Operation Vesna, one of the two largest Soviet deportations from Lithuania
Spring – Green Party (Vesna - zelena stranka), Slovenian political party
Vesna (Russia), liberal youth organization in Russia
Vesna (band), Czech representative for Eurovision Song Contest 2023

See also
Wesna